Morges District is a district in the canton of Vaud in Switzerland.  The seat of the district is the city of Morges.

Geography
Of this area,  or 55.1% is used for agricultural purposes, while  or 33.9% is forested.

Demographics

Most of the population speaks French (56,847 or 82.3%), with German being second most common (3,224 or 4.7%) and Italian being third (2,589 or 3.7%).  There are 22 people who speak Romansh.

Of the population in the district 12,738 or about 18.4% were born in Morges and lived there in 2000.  There were 23,191 or 33.6% who were born in the same canton, while 11,880 or 17.2% were born somewhere else in Switzerland, and 19,384 or 28.1% were born outside of Switzerland.

In  there were 592 live births to Swiss citizens and 198 births to non-Swiss citizens, and in same time span there were 484 deaths of Swiss citizens and 55 non-Swiss citizen deaths.  Ignoring immigration and emigration, the population of Swiss citizens increased by 108 while the foreign population increased by 143.  There were 37 Swiss men and 27 Swiss women who emigrated from Switzerland.  At the same time, there were 585 non-Swiss men and 629 non-Swiss women who immigrated from another country to Switzerland.  The total Swiss population change in 2008 (from all sources, including moves across municipal borders) was an increase of 417 and the non-Swiss population increased by 1055 people.  This represents a population growth rate of 2.1%.

The age distribution, in Morges is; 8,300 children or 11.5% of the population are between 0 and 9 years old and 9,051 teenagers or 12.5% are between 10 and 19.  Of the adult population, 8,180 people or 11.3% of the population are between 20 and 29 years old.  10,572 people or 14.6% are between 30 and 39, 11,911 people or 16.5% are between 40 and 49, and 9,153 people or 12.7% are between 50 and 59.  The senior population distribution is 7,634 people or 10.6% of the population are between 60 and 69 years old, 4,411 people or 6.1% are between 70 and 79,there are 2,489 people or 3.4% who are 80 and 89, and there are 531 people or 0.7% who are 90 and older.

, there were 28,815 people who were single and never married in the district.  There were 32,925 married individuals, 3,126 widows or widowers and 4,211 individuals who are divorced.

There were 9,904 households that consist of only one person and 1,599 households with five or more people.  Out of a total of 29,876 households that answered this question, 33.2% were households made up of just one person and there were 117 adults who lived with their parents.  Of the rest of the households, there are 7,893 married couples without children, 9,114 married couples with children  There were 1,660 single parents with a child or children.  There were 563 households that were made up of unrelated people and 625 households that were made up of some sort of institution or another collective housing.

The historical population is given in the following chart:

Mergers and name changes
On 1 September 2006, the former Aubonne district (District d'Aubonne), Cossonay district (District de Cossonay), and Morges district (District de Morges) were dissolved and merged into the new Morges district.

 The municipalities of Apples, Aubonne, Ballens, Berolle, Bière, Bougy-Villars, Féchy, Gimel, Mollens (VD), Montherod, Pizy, Saint-Livres, Saint-Oyens, and Saubraz came from the Aubonne district (District d'Aubonne).
 The municipalities of La Chaux (Cossonay), Chavannes-le-Veyron, Chevilly, Cossonay, Cottens (VD), Cuarnens, Dizy, Eclépens, Ferreyres, Gollion, Grancy, L'Isle, Mauraz, Moiry, Mont-la-Ville, Montricher, Orny, Pampigny, Pompaples, La Sarraz, Senarclens, and Sévery came from the Cossonay district (District de Cossonay).
 The municipalities of Aclens, Bremblens, Buchillon, Bussy-Chardonney, Chigny, Clarmont, Colombier (VD), Denens, Denges, Echandens, Echichens, Etoy, Lavigny, Lonay, Lully (VD), Lussy-sur-Morges, Monnaz, Morges, Préverenges, Reverolle, Romanel-sur-Morges, Saint-Prex, Saint-Saphorin-sur-Morges, Tolochenaz, Vaux-sur-Morges, and Villars-sous-Yens came from the old Morges district (District de Morges).
 The municipality of Allaman came from the old District of Rolle.

On 1 July 2011 the municipalities of Colombier, Monnaz, and Saint-Saphorin-sur-Morges merged into the municipality of Echichens.

On 1 January 2021 the former municipality of Montherod merged into the municipality of Aubonne.

On 1 July 2021 the former municipalities of Apples, Cottens, Pampigny, Sévery, Bussy-Chardonney and Reverolle merged into the new municipality of Hautemorges.

Politics
In the 2007 federal election the most popular party was the SVP which received 22.18% of the vote.  The next three most popular parties were the SP (21.71%), the FDP (14.66%) and the Green Party (14.08%).  In the federal election, a total of 19,756 votes were cast, and the voter turnout was 46.7%.

Religion
Of the rest of the population, there were 1,056 members of an Orthodox church (or about 1.53% of the population), there were 46 individuals (or about 0.07% of the population) who belonged to the Christian Catholic Church, and there were 1,972 individuals (or about 2.85% of the population) who belonged to another Christian church. There were 127 individuals (or about 0.18% of the population) who were Jewish, and 2,263 (or about 3.28% of the population) who were Islamic. There were 150 individuals who were Buddhist, 85 individuals who were Hindu and 124 individuals who belonged to another church.  9,157 (or about 13.26% of the population) belonged to no church, are agnostic or atheist, and 3,306 individuals (or about 4.79% of the population) did not answer the question.

Education
In Morges about 24,337 or (35.2%) of the population have completed non-mandatory upper secondary education, and 11,370 or (16.5%) have completed additional higher education (either University or a Fachhochschule).  Of the 11,370 who completed tertiary schooling, 48.6% were Swiss men, 26.5% were Swiss women, 15.2% were non-Swiss men and 9.7% were non-Swiss women.

In the 2009/2010 school year there were a total of 9,184 students in the local and district school systems.  In the Vaud cantonal school system, two years of non-obligatory pre-school are provided by the political districts.  During the school year, the district provided pre-school care for a total of 631 children.  There were 203 (32.2%) children who received subsidized pre-school care.  There were 4,838 students in the primary school program, which last four years.  The obligatory lower secondary school program lasts for six years and there were 4,238 students in those schools.  There were also 108 students who were home schooled or attended another non-traditional school.

Municipalities
The following municipalities are located within the district:

References

Districts of the canton of Vaud